The Social Green Regionalist Federation (FREVS) is a Chilean political party.

It was founded on January 14, 2017 after the union of the regionalist parties Regional and Popular Front, Green North Regional Force, Social Agrarian Regionalist Independent Movement and We Are Aysén.

The Federation was created as a result of the new law of political parties that requires the constitution of the parties in at least three contiguous or eight discontinuous regions, and to be able to present candidacies to the parliamentary elections and of regional boards.

In 2017 they joined the Patagonian Regional Democracy party to form the Green Regionalist Coalition electoral pact.

The leaders of the parties that make up the federation and its home region are the following:

 Jaime Mulet, president of the Regional and Popular Front (Antofagasta and Atacama).
 Agapito Santander, president of the Green North Regional Force (Coquimbo).
 Alejandra Sepúlveda, president of the Social Agrarian Regionalist Independent Movement (O'Higgins).
 Jonathan Hechenleitner, president of We Are Aysén (Aysén).

Presidential candidates 
The following is a list of the presidential candidates supported by the Social Green Regionalist Federation. (Information gathered from the Archive of Chilean Elections). 
2017: none
2021: Gabriel Boric (won)

References

External links
 Social Green Regionalist Federation 

2017 establishments in Chile
Ecosocialist parties
Political parties established in 2017
Political parties in Chile
Regionalist parties
Socialist parties in Chile